Marcus Yates Andreasson (born July 13, 1978) is a Liberian former professional footballer.
 
His preferred position is centre-back, but he can also play as a midfielder and striker because of his great height and strength. 
Andreasson is a flexible player and can easily adjust into different roles.

Career 
He has played for most of his career in top clubs in Scandinavia, but has also played for clubs in the rest of Europe. 
He has played previously for Lierse in the Belgium Pro League, for Norwegian club Molde FK, Swedish clubs Kosta IF, Kalmar FF and Östers IF, English club Bristol Rovers, Norwegian club Bryne FK and Swedish Division 6 club Kosta IF.

Andreasson also represented Sweden at U21 level.

Honours
Molde FK
Norwegian Cup: 2005

References 

1978 births
Living people
People from Buchanan, Liberia
Swedish footballers
Swedish people of Liberian descent
Sportspeople of Liberian descent
Liberian footballers
Bristol Rovers F.C. players
Expatriate footballers in England
Expatriate footballers in Belgium
Swedish expatriate footballers
Expatriate footballers in Norway
Swedish expatriate sportspeople in Norway
Swedish expatriate sportspeople in the United Kingdom
Association football defenders
Bryne FK players
Kalmar FF players
Molde FK players
Östers IF players
Lierse S.K. players
Allsvenskan players
Eliteserien players
Norwegian First Division players
English Football League players
Belgian Pro League players
Molde FK non-playing staff